Jordan Kuwait Bank, a Jordanian public shareholding company, was founded in 1976 and has successfully evolved into a major player in the Jordanian banking system over the last few years. The bank currently operates a domestic network of 62 branches and offices distributed throughout Jordan in addition to four branches in Palestine and a branch (IBU) in Cyprus. The bank’s paid-up capital  was gradually increased from JD 5 million in 1976 to JD 100  million (USD 141m) in 2008.  According to the bank's website, its philosophy rests on the concept of bringing capital into Jordan from other Arab countries, especially Kuwait.

Related organizations
Jordan Kuwait Bank holds a controlling shares of more than 50% in the United Financial Investments Company (Jordan) and a10% stake in Gulf Bank Algeria.

In 2018, it acquired 10% of Al Quds Bank. Following the deal, the Jordan Kuwait Bank's branches in Palestine were merged with Al Quds Bank.

References

External links

Jordan Kuwait Bank 

Banks of Jordan
Banks established in 1976
Jordan–Kuwait relations
1976 establishments in Jordan
Companies listed on the Amman Stock Exchange